Sapperton is a neighbourhood of the City of New Westminster, British Columbia, Canada, located in the northeastern end of that city and up to its boundaries with the Coquitlam and Burnaby. Located on the slope above the Fraser River and focused on Brunette Avenue and Columbia Street, and northeast of the former British Columbia Penitentiary, the neighbourhood was the location of the barracks and other housing for the Royal Engineers, Columbia Detachment, who were known as "sappers", hence the name. The neighbourhood of Sapperton is filled with plenty of shops for many different needs. The shops include a place for your bicycle needs, a bar to get a drink, restaurants and karate places as well. Also located in Sapperton is the Royal Columbian Hospital. The neighbourhood of Sapperton also has plenty of outdoor space. It has multiple parks such as Sapperton and Hume Parks where anybody can spend their time on a nice day. Hume Park also contains a swimming pool and has a forested area where people can head down to enjoy the Brunette River. Sapperton is also located close to two Skytrain stations. These stations are Sapperton station, which is close to the hospital, and Braid station, which is just at the bottom of Sapperton. Furthermore, Sapperton is home to New Westminster's newest brewery which is named, Another Beer Co.

References

Neighbourhoods in New Westminster
Populated places on the Fraser River